Piette may refer to:

Albert Piette (born 1960), Belgian anthropologist
Édouard Piette (1827–1906), French archaeologist
Jacques Piette (1926–1990), French politician
Josly Piette (born 1943), Belgian politician
Ludovic Piette (1826–1878), French Impressionist painter
Maurice Piette (1871–1953), Monégasque politician
Samuel Piette (born 1994), Canadian footballer